Vanessa Spence (born 1961, Kingston, Jamaica) is a Jamaican novelist. Her first novel, The Roads Are Down, won the 1994 Commonwealth Writers' Prize, Best First Novel, Canada and the Caribbean.

She grew up in Jamaica, and studied at the University of Oxford, and Yale University. 
She works, as an economist, in Kingston.
She lives in the Blue Mountains.

Awards
 1994, Commonwealth Writers' Prize, Best First Novel, Canada and the Caribbean

Works
The Roads Are Down, Heinemann, 1993,

References

External links
Author's website
Reviews
"Book Review: The Roads are Down by Vanessa Spence", Wamathai, 5 May 2011
Criticism
"Her foolish heart", The Caribbean Review of Books, May 2009
"Revolutionary roads", The Caribbean Review of Books, July 2010

1961 births
Living people
People from Kingston, Jamaica
Alumni of the University of Oxford
Yale University alumni
20th-century Jamaican novelists
Jamaican women novelists
20th-century Jamaican women writers